Susi Susanti: Love All is a 2019 Indonesian biographical film about Susi Susanti, badminton athlete who won the first gold medal for Indonesia at the 1992 Summer Olympics. The film was directed by Sim F in his directorial debut. The film stars Laura Basuki as Susanti and Dion Wiyoko as Alan Budikusuma.

The film was theatrically released on 24 October 2019. For her portrayal of Susanti, Basuki won the Citra Award for Best Actress, the film's only win out of thirteen nominations it received at the ceremony.

Premise
Susi Susanti: Love All tells about the life of Susi Susanti from her childhood until her retirement, including her life during May 1998 riots of Indonesia, her citizenship and her relationship with Alan Budikusuma.

Cast
Laura Basuki as Susi Susanti
Moira Tabina Zayn as teenage Susi Susanti
Dion Wiyoko as Alan Budikusuma
Jenny Chang as Liang Chiu Sia
Chew Kin Wah as Tong Sin Fu
Lukman Sardi as MF Siregar
Farhan as Try Sutrisno, general chairman of Badminton Association of Indonesia
Rafael Tan as Hermawan Susanto
Kelly Tandiono as Sarwendah Kusumawardhani
Delon Thamrin as Rudy Gunawan, Susanti's older brother
Nathaniel Sulistyo as Ardy Wiranata
Iszur Muchtar as Risad Haditono, Susanti's father
Dayu Wijanto as Purwa Benowati, Susanti's mother
Kristo Immanuel as Suharto (voice)

Production
The idea of the film was conceived after producer Daniel Mananta had a conversation with Susanti in a show, then he was interested to adapt her life story into a film. Susanti revealed that once a production company approached to do so, but the project had never realized.

The production of the film started in 2016, then director Sim F joined in mid-2017 to develop the screenplay. Susanti also contributed during the production by providing properties, such as medals, trophies, and photos. Basuki and Wiyoko were trained for five months under an athlete's treatment by Susanti's then-coach, Liang Chu Sia. 

Principal photography began in August 2018. The filming took place in the actual locations around Tasikmalaya, Pangandaran, and Jakarta.

Release
Susi Susanti: Love All was theatrically released on 24 October 2019. The film garnered 190,241 moviegoers during its run and grossed Rp 7.6 billion ($533,502). Disney+ Hotstar acquired the distribution rights to the film, releasing it on 1 January 2021.

The film was screened at the 2021 Beijing International Film Festival.

Accolades

References

2010s biographical films
2010s sports films
Indonesian biographical drama films
2019 directorial debut films
Cultural depictions of badminton players
Biographical films about sportspeople
Films shot in Indonesia
Films set in Jakarta
Films set in Barcelona
Films set in Atlanta
Films about the 1992 Summer Olympics
Films about the 1996 Summer Olympics
Badminton films
2019 films